Mollasani (also Romanized as Mollāsānī, Mollā S̄ānī, Mollā Sāny, and Mulla Sāni; also known as Rāmīn) is a city and capital of Bavi County, Khuzestan Province, Iran.  At the 2006 census, its population was 13,979, in 2,563 families.

References 

Populated places in Bavi County

Cities in Khuzestan Province
Arab settlements in Khuzestan Province